The 64th Filmfare Awards ceremony, presented by The Times Group, honored the best Indian Hindi-language films of 2018. The ceremony was held on 23 March 2019 in Mumbai.

Padmaavat led the ceremony with 18 nominations, followed by Raazi with 15 nominations and Andhadhun with 11 nominations.

Andhadhun and Raazi won 5 awards each, thus becoming the most-awarded films at the ceremony, with the former winning Best Film (Critics) and Best Actor (Critics) (for Ayushmann Khurrana), and the latter winning Best Film, Best Director (for Meghna Gulzar), and Best Actress (for Alia Bhatt).

Badhaai Ho and Padmaavat won 4 awards each; Tumbbad and Sanju won 3 and 2 awards respectively, with the latter winning Best Actor (for Ranbir Kapoor).

For the first time in the history of the Filmfare Awards, there was a tie for Best Supporting Actor – when Gajraj Rao for Badhaai Ho tied with Vicky Kaushal for Sanju for the award.

Winners and nominees

Public voting for nominations on the Filmfare website opened on the end of December 2018 and closed at the end of January 2019. Nominees were announced on 12 March 2019 and the winners were announced on 23 March 2019.

Popular Awards

Critics' Awards
Nominations for the critics award was announced on 12 March 2019.

Special Awards

Technical Awards
The winners were announced on 23 March 2019.

Superlatives

Multiple nominations

Multiple wins

See also
 Filmfare Awards
 List of Bollywood films of 2018

References

External links
 Filmfare Official Website
 Filmfare Awards 2019

Filmfare Awards
2019 Indian film awards